WLJR (88.5 FM) is a non-commercial educational radio station licensed to serve Birmingham, Alabama, United States. The station is owned by Briarwood Presbyterian Church.

WLJR broadcasts a religious radio format to the greater Birmingham area. The station derives a majority of its programming from the Moody Broadcasting Network and American Family Radio. It is also available online at playwljr.com

History
More than five years after the initial application was filed, this station received its original construction permit from the Federal Communications Commission on November 4, 1992. The new station was assigned the call letters WLJR by the FCC on February 10, 1993.  After several extensions, WLJR received its license to cover from the FCC on June 4, 1998. On-air broadcasting began February 20, 1998. In December 2013 WLJR began streaming on the Internet. This Internet stream may be accessed through the station's website, or directly at www.playwljr.com.

References

External links
WLJR official website
WLJR online stream

LJR
LJR
Radio stations established in 1998
Jefferson County, Alabama
Moody Radio affiliate stations
American Family Radio stations
1998 establishments in Alabama